Porozumienie ponad podziałami is the second studio album by Polish rapcore band Kazik Na Żywo. It was released on September 24, 1995 in Poland through S.P. Records. The cover art was created by Jan Staszewski. Porozumienie ponad podziałami is considered the best album in whole Kazik Na Żywo carrier.

Porozumienie ponad podziałami is considered to be one of the most important albums in the history of Polish rock.

Track listing

8. - music: Tomasz "Titus" Pukacki (Acid Drinkers)
10. - music: Kazimierz Staszewski i Jacek Kufirski
12. and 13. - first release only on CC

Personnel
Kazik Staszewski - vocal, guitar, lyrics
Adam Burzyński - guitar
Robert Friedrich - guitar, vocal 
Tomasz Goehs - drums, vocal 
Michał Kwiatkowski - bass, guitar

References

1995 albums
Kazik na Żywo albums